The following is a list of islands in the Chagos Archipelago. The archipelago is a British Indian Ocean Territory.

Speakers Bank
Great Speakers Reef

Blenheim Reef
 Ile du Nord
 Ile du Milieu
 Ile de l'Est
 Ile du Sud

Peros Banhos

Southwest rim (between southern channel and Passe de l'Île Poule)
Île Fouquet
Mapou de l'Île du Coin
Île du Coin
Île Anglaise
Île Monpâtre
Île Gabrielle
Île Poule

Northwest rim (between Passe de l'Île Poule and Moresby Channel)
Petite Soeur
Grande Soeur
Île Finon
Île Verte
Île Libbon
Île Manon
Île Pierre
Île Diable
Petite Île Mapou
Grande Île Mapou
Île Diamant

Eastern part (east of southern channel and Moresby Channel)
Île de la Passe
Moresby Island
Île Saint-Brandon
Île Parasol
Île Longue
Grande Île Bois Mangue
Petite Île Bois Mangue
Île Manoël
Île Animaux
Île Yeye
Petite Île Coquillage
Grande Île Coquillage
Coin du Mire
Île Vache Marine

Passe de l'Île Poule is also called Passe Elisabeth on older maps.

Salomon Islands
Île de la Passe
Île Mapou
Île Takamaka
Île Fouquet
Île Sepulture
Île Jacobin
Île du Sel
Île Poule
Île Boddam
Île Diable
Île Anglaise

Great Chagos Bank
Danger Island
Eagle Islands
Île Aigle (Eagle Island)
Sea Cow Island (Île Vache Marines)
Three Brothers (Trois Fréres)
South Brother Island (Île du Sud)
Middle Brother Island (Île du Milieu)
North Brother Island (Île du Nord)
Resurgent

Diego Garcia
Diego Garcia
East Island
Middle Island
West Island
Anniversary Island (sand bar)

Egmont Islands
Île Sud-Est
Île Takamaka
Île Carre Pate
Île Lubine
Île Cipaye
Île aux Rats

British Indian Ocean Territory-related lists
Lists of islands of the United Kingdom